Brestovac is a village and a municipality in eastern Croatia, located west of Požega.

There are 3,726 inhabitants in the municipality, 91% of which are Croats. The largest villages and their corresponding populations are:

 Brestovac, 670
 Završje, 323
 Nurkovac, 244
 Skenderovci, 221
 Pavlovci, 190
 Zakorenje, 187
 Orljavac, 167

Full list of settlements:
Amatovci, Bogdašić, Bolomače, Boričevci, Brestovac, 
Busnovi, Crljenci, Čečavac, Čečavački Vučjak, Daranovci, 
Deževci, Dolac, Donji Gučani, Gornji Gučani, Ivandol, 
Jaguplije, Jeminovac, Kamenska, Kamenski Šeovci, Kamenski Vučjak, 
Koprivna, Kruševo, Kujnik, Mihajlije, Mijači, 
Mrkoplje, Novo Zvečevo, Nurkovac, Oblakovac, Orljavac, 
Pasikovci, Pavlovci, Perenci, Podsreće, Požeški Brđani, 
Rasna, Ruševac, Sažije, Skenderovci, Sloboština, 
Striježevica, Šnjegavić, Šušnjari, Vilić Selo, Vranić, 
Zakorenje, Završje and Žigerovci.

See also
Monument to the victory of the people of Slavonia

References

Populated places in Požega-Slavonia County
Slavonia
Municipalities of Croatia